The Uniform Task-Based Management System (UTBMS) is a set of codes designed to standardize categorization and facilitate analysis of legal work and expenses. UTBMS was produced through a collaborative effort among the American Bar Association Section of Litigation, the American Corporate Counsel Association, and a group of major corporate clients and law firms coordinated and supported by Price Waterhouse LLP (now PricewaterhouseCoopers).  UTBMS codes are now maintained and developed by the Legal Electronic Data Exchange Standard (LEDES) Oversight Committee.

Background
UTBMS coding is reflected in legal bills sent from a law firm to its corporate clients. Law firms will usually use coding on time and expenses only for those clients who explicitly request it. Most clients who use UTBMS also require electronic billing, usually with an invoice in a LEDES e-billing format.

Fees, which are charges for attorney and legal assistant time, are coded with task and activity codes. There are five sets of task codes: Litigation, Intellectual Property, Counseling, Project and Bankruptcy. The set used for a given matter (i.e., case or transaction) depends upon the nature of that matter. Tasks may be summarized into phases. Tasks are often reported without reporting the phase, as this can be deduced from the task. The phase/task hierarchy is uniform in the Litigation, Intellectual Property and Bankruptcy task code sets. In the Project set, only the second phase contains multiple tasks. The Counseling set has only a single level. (In such situations, a code may be considered both a phase and a task, and it may be necessary to program the time and billing software this way.) There is a single set of activity codes, which is used in conjunction with each of the four task code sets. There is also a single set of expense codes, which are independent of phase, task and activity codes.

The codes themselves are composed of a letter (the first letter of the task code set), followed by a three-digit number. Tasks sharing the same letter and first digit belong to the same phase.

From time-to-time, the LEDES Oversight Committee (LOC), the administrative body that oversees these codes, adds and changes codes. In 2007, a set of Intellectual Property codes (for patents and trademarks) were finalized and ratified. In 2011, a set of "eDiscovery" codes were ratified.  In 2015, the LOC ratified a set of Governance, Risk and Compliance codes based on the Open Compliance & Ethics Group (OCEG) GRC Capability Model.

Lists of the Codes
The code lists are taken from http://www.abanet.org/litigation/utbms/home.html, which has the following Disclaimer & Copyright message:

The authors hereby grant permission to use the codes and related definitions, in whole or in part, on a non-exclusive, royalty-free basis. In addition, this document may be freely reproduced and distributed in any electronic or hardcopy medium, on a nonexclusive, royalty-free basis, provided that this reproduction and distribution are not for profit, and that this title page is included in its entirety.

Litigation Code Set
L100 Case Assessment, Development and Administration
L110 Fact Investigation/Development
L120 Analysis/Strategy
L130 Experts/Consultants
L140 Document/File Management
L150 Budgeting
L160 Settlement/Non-Binding ADR
L190 Other Case Assessment, Development and Administration
L200 Pre-Trial Pleadings and Motions
L210 Pleadings
L220 Preliminary Injunctions/Provisional Remedies
L230 Court Mandated Conferences
L240 Dispositive Motions
L250 Other Written Motions and Submissions
L260 Class Action Certification and Notice
L300 Discovery
L310 Written Discovery
L320 Document Production
L330 Depositions
L340 Expert Discovery
L350 Discovery Motions
L390 Other Discovery
L400 Trial Preparation and Trial
L410 Fact Witnesses
L420 Expert Witnesses
L430 Written Motions and Submissions
L440 Other Trial Preparation and Support
L450 Trial and Hearing Attendance
L460 Post-Trial Motions and Submissions
L470 Enforcement
L500 Appeal
L510 Appellate Motions and Submissions
L520 Appellate Briefs
L530 Oral Argument

eDiscovery Code Set
L600 Identification
L601 Discovery planning
L602 Interviews
L609 Quality assurance and control
L610 Preservation 
L611 Preservation order
L612 Legal hold
L619 Quality assurance and control
L620 Collection
L621 Collection/Recovery
L622 Media costs
L623 Media/ESI Transfer, Receipt, Inventory
L629 Quality assurance and control
L630 Processing
L631 ESI stage, preparation and process
L632 Scanning - Hard Copy
L633 Foreign language translation
L634 Exception handling
L639 Quality assurance and control
L650 Review 
L651 Hosting costs
L693 Review Planning & Training
L652 Objective and Subjective coding
L653 First pass document review
L654 Second pass document review
L655 Privilege review
L656 Redaction
L659 Quality assurance and control
L660 Analysis
L670 Production 
L671 Conversion of ESI to production format
L679 Quality assurance and control
L680 Presentation 
L690 Project Management

Counseling Code Set
C100 Fact Gathering
C200 Researching Law
C300 Analysis and Advice
C400 Third Party Communication

Project Code Set
P100 Project Administration
P200 Fact Gathering/Due Diligence
P210 Corporate Review
P220 Tax
P230 Environmental
P240 Real and Personal Property
P250 Employee/Labor
P260 Intellectual Property
P270 Regulatory Reviews
P280 Other
P300 Structure/Strategy/Analysis
P400 Initial Document Preparation/Filing
P500 Negotiation/Revision/Responses
P600 Completion/Closing
P700 Post-Completion/Post-Closing
P800 Maintenance and Renewal

Bankruptcy Code Set
B100 Administration
B110 Case Administration
B120 Asset Analysis and Recovery
B130 Asset Disposition
B140 Relief from Stay/Adequate Protection Proceedings
B150 Meetings of and Communications with Creditors
B160 Fee/Employment Applications
B170 Fee/Employment Objections
B180 Avoidance Action Analysis
B185 Assumption/Rejection of Leases and Contracts
B190 Other Contested Matters (excluding assumption/rejection motions)
B195 Non-Working Travel
B200 Operations
B210 Business Operations
B220 Employee Benefits/Pensions
B230 Financing/Cash Collections
B240 Tax Issues
B250 Real Estate
B260 Board of Directors Matters
B300 Claims and Plan
B310 Claims Administration and Objections
B320 Plan and Disclosure Statement (including Business Plan
B400 Bankruptcy-Related Advice
B410 General Bankruptcy Advice/Opinions
B420 Restructurings

Patent Code Set
PA100	Assessment, Development, and Administration
PA110	Fact Investigation and Development
PA120	Analysis/Strategy
PA130	Document/File Management
PA140	Budgeting
PA199	Other Assessment, Development, or Administration
PA200	Patent Investigation and Analysis
PA210	State-of-the-Art Investigation
PA220	Patentability Investigation
PA230	Clearance Investigation
PA240	Validity Investigation
PA250	Publication Watches
PA260	Infringement Investigation
PA270	Status Investigation
PA299	Other Patent Investigation and Analysis
PA300	Domestic Patent Preparation
PA310	Provisional Application Preparation - Domestic
PA320	Non-Provisional Application Preparation - Domestic
PA330	Design Application Preparation - Domestic
PA340	Plant Patent Preparation - Domestic
PA350	Continuing Application Preparation - Domestic
PA360	Validation Patent Application Preparation - Domestic
PA399	Other Patent Application Preparation - Domestic
PA400 Domestic Patent Prosecution
PA450	Post-Issuance Remedial Action - Domestic
PA560	Validation Patent Application Preparation - International
PA650	Post-Issuance Remedial Action - International
PA410	Information Disclosure Statement - Domestic
PA420	Preliminary Amendment - Domestic
PA430	Official Communication - Domestic
PA440	Quasi-Judicial Administrative Proceedings - Domestic
PA499	Other Patent Prosecution - Domestic
PA500 International Patent Preparation
PA510	Provisional Application Preparation - International
PA520	Non-Provisional Application Preparation - International
PA530	Design Application Preparation - International
PA540	Plant Patent Preparation - International
PA550	Continuing Application Preparation - International
PA599	Other Patent Application Preparation - International
PA600 International Patent Prosecution
PA610	Information Disclosure Statement - International
PA620	Preliminary Amendment - International
PA630	Official Communication - International
PA640	Quasi-Judicial Administrative Proceedings - International
PA699	Other Patent Prosecution - International
PA700 Other Patent-Related Tasks
PA710	Opinion Preparation
PA720	Portfolio Analysis and Management
PA730	Assignments and Security Interests
PA740	Licensing

Trademark Code Set
TR100 Assessment, Development, and Administration
TR110	Fact Investigation and Development
TR120	Analysis/Strategy
TR130	Document/File Management
TR140	Budgeting
TR199	Other Assessment, Development, or Administration
TR200 Trademark Investigation and Analysis
TR220 Registerability Investigation
TR230	Clearance Investigation
TR240	Opposition Investigation
TR250	Publication Watches
TR260	Enforcement Investigation
TR270	Status Investigation
TR299	Other Trademark Investigation and Analysis
TR300 Domestic Trademark Application Preparation
TR310	Application Preparation and Filing - Domestic
TR399	Other Domestic Trademark Application Preparation and Filing
TR400	Domestic Trademark Prosecution and Renewal
TR410	Aff., Pet., Ext., Decl. and Other Filings - Domestic
TR420	Preliminary Amendment - Domestic
TR430	Official Communication - Domestic
TR440	Quasi-Judicial Administrative Proceedings - Domestic
TR499	Other Trademark Prosecution - Domestic
TR500	International Trademark Application Preparation and Renewals
TR510	Application Preparation and Filing - International
TR599	Other International Trademark Application Prep. and Filing
TR600 International Trademark Prosecution and Renewal
TR610	Aff., Pet., Ext., Decl. and Other Filings - International
TR620	Preliminary Amendment - International
TR630	Official Communication - International
TR640	Quasi-Judicial Administrative Proceedings - International
TR699	Other Trademark Prosecution - International
TR700 Other Trademark Related Tasks
TR710	Opinion Preparation
TR720	Portfolio Analysis and Management
TR730	Assignments and Security Interests
TR740	Licensing
TR750	Domain Names - gTLDs
TR760	Domain Names - ccTLDs
TR770	Quasi-Judicial Administrative Proceedings - Domain Names
TR799	Other Trademark Prosecution

Activity Codes
A100 Activities
A101 Plan and prepare for
A102 Research
A103 Draft/revise
A104 Review/analyze
A105 Communicate (in firm)
A106 Communicate (with client)
A107 Communicate (other outside counsel)
A108 Communicate (other external)
A109 Appear for/attend
A110 Manage data/files
A111 Other
A112 Travel

In late 2013, the Activity Code set was updated and ratified. 
A101 Plan and prepare for
A102 Research
A103 Draft/Revise
A104 Review/Analyze
A105 Communicate (within legal team)
A106 Communicate (with client)
A107 Communicate (opponents/other outside counsel)
A113 Communicate (witnesses)
A114 Communicate (experts)
A108 Communicate (other external)
A109 Appear For/Attend
A110 Manage Data/Files/Documentation
A112 Billable Travel Time
A115 Medical Record and Medical Bill Management
A116 Training
A117 Special Handling Copying/Scanning/Imaging (Internal)
A118 Collection-Forensic
A119 Culling & Filtering 
A120 Processing
A121 Review and Analysis
A122 Quality Assurance and Control
A123 Search Creation and Execution
A124 Privilege Review Culling and Log Creation
A125 Document Production Creation and Preparation
A126 Evidence/Exhibit Creation and Preparation
A127 Project Management 
A128 Collection Closing Activities
A111 Other

Expense Codes
E100 Expenses
E101 Copying
E102 Outside printing
E103 Word processing
E104 Facsimile
E105 Telephone
E106 Online research
E107 Delivery services/messengers
E108 Postage
E109 Local travel
E110 Out-of-town travel
E111 Meals
E112 Court fees
E113 Subpoena fees
E114 Witness fees
E115 Deposition transcripts
E116 Trial transcripts
E117 Trial exhibits
E118 Litigation support vendors
E119 Experts
E120 Private investigators
E121 Arbitrators/mediators
E122 Local counsel
E123 Other professionals
E124 Other

In late 2013, the Expense Code set was reworked and ratified.

X100 Expenses
X101 Copies/Blowbacks/Printing-Black & White (Internal)
X102 Copies/Blowbacks/Printing-Color (Internal)
X103 Copy Service (External)
X104 Special Handling Copying/Scanning/Imaging (Internal)
X105 Word Processing
X106 Facsimile
X107 Telephone-Local
X108 Telephone-Long Distance
X109 Telephone-Mobile
X110 Conference Call/Video Call/Webinar Charges
X111 Online Legal Research
X112 Delivery Services/Messengers
X113 Postage
X114 Local Travel
X115 Out-of-Town Travel
X116 Meals
X117 Court and Governmental Agency Fees
X118 Eviction Costs
X119 Foreclosure Costs
X120 Title Insurance Costs
X121 Immigration Costs
X122 Late Fees
X123 Publication Costs
X124 Publications/Books/Treatises
X125 ATE Premiums/Insurance
X126 Witness Fees
X127 Deposition Transcripts
X128 Trial Transcripts
X129 Trial Exhibits
X130 Medical Records Costs
X131 Medical Records Analysis
X132 Medical Record Service Provider Fees
X133 Private Investigators, Investigative Reports and Investigation Fees
X134 Arbitrators/Mediators
X135 Local Counsel
X136 Appraiser/Appraisal Fees
X137 Experts, Consultants, Other Vendors and Professionals
X138 Litigation Support Vendors
X139 Translation
X140 Special Purpose Location/Office Rental
X141 Special Purpose Moving and Storage Fees
X142 Settlement Costs 
X143 Bank Fees
X200 Drawings
X201 Patent and Trademark Records
X202 Patent and Trademark Searching and Monitoring
X203 Patent and Trademark Prosecution Application Official Fees, Excluding Prosecution Post-Issuance and Opposition Fees
X204 Patent and Trademark Prosecution Post-Issuance (Patent Maintenance and Trademark Renewal) Fees, Excluding Prosecution Application and Opposition Fees 
X205 Official Fees, Patent and Trademark Opposition Fees, Excluding Prosecution (Application or Post-Issuance) Fees
X206 IP Annuity Payments
X207 IP Holdbacks
X300 Discovery/eDiscovery Collection-Forensic
X301 Discovery/eDiscovery Collection-Third Party
X302 Discovery/eDiscovery Culling & Filtering
X303 Bates Stamping/ Control Numbers
X304 Discovery/eDiscovery Review and Analysis
X305 Discovery/eDiscovery Privilege Review Culling and Log Creation
X306 Discovery/eDiscovery Document Production Creation and Preparation
X309 Discovery/eDiscovery Evidence/Exhibit Creation and Preparation
X307 Electronic Media Cost
X308 Discovery/eDiscovery Technical Services-Other
X400 Software License/User Access Fee
X401 Subscription Fee
X402 Transaction Fee
X403 Hardware Costs
X404 Hosting Fees- Internal
X405 Data Storage Fees- Internal
X999 Other

Civil Litigation J-Code Set (England & Wales)
JA00	Funding
JA10	Funding
JB00	Budgeting incl. costs estimates
JB10	Budgeting - own side's costs
JB20	Budgeting - Precedent H
JB30	Budgeting - between the parties
JC00	Initial and Pre-Action Protocol Work
JC10	Factual investigation
JC20	Legal investigation
JC30	Pre-action protocol (or similar) work
JD00	ADR / Settlement
JD10	Mediation
JD20	Other Settlement Matters
JE00	Issue / Statements of Case
JE10	Issue and Serve Proceedings and Preparation of Statement(s) of Case
JE20	Review of Other Party(s)' Statements of Case
JE30	Requests for Further Information
JE40	Amendment of Statements of Case
JF00	Disclosure
JF10	Preparation of the disclosure report and the disclosure proposal
JF20	Obtaining and reviewing documents
JF30	Preparing and serving disclosure lists
JF40	Inspection and review of the other side's disclosure for work undertaken after exchange of disclosure lists.
JG00	Witness statements
JG10	Taking, preparing and finalising witness statement(s)
JG20	Reviewing Other Party(s)' witness statement(s)
JH00	Expert reports
JH10	Own expert evidence 
JH20	Other Party(s)' expert evidence
JH30	Joint expert evidence
JI00	Case and Costs Management Hearings
JI10	Case Management Conference
JI20	Pre Trial Review
JI30	Costs Management Conference
JJ00	Interim Applications and Hearings (Interlocutory Applications)
JJ10	Applications relating to originating process or Statement of Case or for default or summary judgment
JJ20	Applications for an injunction or committal
JJ30	Applications for disclosure or Further Information
JJ40	Applications concerning evidence
JJ50	Applications relating to Costs alone
JJ60	Permission applications
JJ70	Other applications
JK00	Trial preparation
JK10	Preparation of trial bundles
JK20	General work regarding preparation for trial
JL00	Trial
JL10	Advocacy
JL20	Support of advocates
JL30	Judgment and post-trial activity
JM00	Costs Assessment
JM10	Preparing costs claim
JM20	Points of dispute, Replies and Negotiations
JM30	Hearings
JM40	Post Assessment Work (excluding Hearings)

References

External links
ABA Section of Litigation Uniform Task-Based Management System Information
utbms.com
LEDES.org

Legal communication